Diblemma donisthorpei is the only species in the spider genus Diblemma. It is a member of the family Oonopidae. The species is found in the Seychelles and has been introduced in Britain.

See also
 List of Oonopidae species

References

External links

 Diblemma on www.biolib.cz

Oonopidae
Spiders of Africa
Spiders of Europe
Spiders described in 1908